Vasili Demchenko (born March 16, 1994) is a Russian professional ice hockey goaltender. He is currently playing with Avangard Omsk in the Kontinental Hockey League (KHL).

Playing career
Demchenko originally played as a youth within local club, Traktor Chelyabinsk. Undrafted, he made his professional debut in the Kontinental Hockey League, appearing in 1 game during the 2013–14 season.

Assuming starting goaltender duties from the 2015–16 season, Demchenko made 198 appearances with Traktor Chelyabinsk before transferring during the 2019–20 season to Metallurg Magnitogorsk on December 3, 2019. He made 14 further appearances with Magnitogorsk, collecting just 2 wins.

As a free agent on 21 April 2020, Demchenko was signed to a one-year, entry-level contract with the Montreal Canadiens. In the pandemic delayed 2020–21 season, Demchenko was re-assigned to join the Canadiens American Hockey League (AHL) affiliate, the Laval Rocket. With his season interrupted through injury, Demchenko appeared in just 4 games with the Rocket, posting 3 wins. 

On 19 May 2021, Demchenko as an impending restricted free agent opted to leave the Montreal Canadiens and return to Russia in signing a one-year contract with newly crowned KHL Champions, Avangard Omsk.

Career statistics

References

External links

1994 births
Living people
Avangard Omsk players
Belye Medvedi Chelyabinsk players
Chelmet Chelyabinsk players
Laval Rocket players
Metallurg Magnitogorsk players
Russian ice hockey goaltenders
Traktor Chelyabinsk players